O'Connor v. Donaldson, 422 U.S. 563 (1975), was a landmark decision of the US Supreme Court in mental health law ruling that a state cannot constitutionally confine a non-dangerous individual who is capable of surviving safely in freedom by themselves or with the help of willing and responsible family members or friends. Since the trial court jury found, upon ample evidence, that petitioner did so confine respondent, the Supreme Court upheld the trial court's conclusion that petitioner had violated respondent's right to liberty.

Overview
Kenneth Donaldson (confined patient) had been held for 15 years in Florida State Hospital at Chattahoochee, due to needs of "care, maintenance, and treatment." He filed a lawsuit against the hospital and staff members claiming they had robbed him of his constitutional rights, by confining him against his will. Donaldson won his case (including monetary damages) in United States District Court, which was affirmed by the United States Court of Appeals for the Fifth Circuit.  In 1975, the United States Supreme Court agreed that Donaldson had been improperly confined but vacated the award of damages.  On remand, the Fifth Circuit ordered that a new trial on damages be held.

A finding of "mental illness" alone cannot justify a State's locking a person up against his will and keeping him indefinitely in simple custodial confinement. Assuming that that term can be given a reasonably precise content and that the "mentally ill" can be identified with reasonable accuracy, there is still no constitutional basis for confining such persons involuntarily if they are dangerous to no one and can live safely in freedom.

Kenneth Donaldson
The origins of Donaldson's institutionalization began in 1943, at age 34, when he suffered a traumatic episode. He was hospitalized and received treatment, before resuming life with his family.

In 1956 Donaldson traveled to Florida to visit his elderly parents. While there, Donaldson reported that he believed one of his neighbors in Philadelphia might be poisoning his food. His father, worried that his son suffered from paranoid delusions, petitioned the court for a sanity hearing. Donaldson was evaluated, diagnosed with "paranoid schizophrenia," and civilly committed to the Florida State mental health system. At his commitment trial, Donaldson did not have legal counsel present to represent his case. Once he entered the Florida hospital, Donaldson was placed with dangerous criminals, even though he had never been proved to be dangerous to himself or others. His ward was understaffed, with only one doctor (who happened to be an obstetrician) for over 1,000 male patients. There were no psychiatrists or counsellors, and the only nurse on site worked in the infirmary.

He spent 15 years as a patient; he did not receive any treatment, actively refusing it, and attempting to secure his release. Throughout his stay he denied he was ever mentally ill, and refused to be put into a halfway house.

Donaldson later wrote a book about his experience as a mental patient titled Insanity Inside Out.

See also
 List of United States Supreme Court cases, volume 422
 Jackson v. Indiana (1972)
 Addington v. Texas (1979)
 Jones v. United States (1983)
 Foucha v. Louisiana (1992)

References

External links

Kenneth Donaldson Papers (MS 1677). Manuscripts and Archives, Yale University Library.

United States Supreme Court cases
Mental health law in the United States
1975 in United States case law
American Civil Liberties Union litigation
Imprisonment and detention in the United States
United States Supreme Court cases of the Burger Court